This event was held on Sunday 29 January 2012 as part of the 2012 UCI Cyclo-cross World Championships. Ten laps had to be completed, totalling up to 29.44 kilometre.

Summary

In the weeks before the race, four favourites emerged: Sven Nys, who has been considered a favourite on about every race since he became a professional, Kevin Pauwels, who had won the World Cup the week before, Zdeněk Štybar, the World Champion of the two previous years and Niels Albert, who had a lousy season, but is known to be great in the sand.

Albert started very quickly with Štybar right behind him. However halfway round the first lap Albert was already alone while Štybar got caught up by the pack. A lap later Pauwels had left the others and was gaining on Albert, but never actually got there. Meanwhile, in the background, the five other Belgian riders were together with Štybar hanging at the end of that group.

By lap four, Nys had joined Pauwels in the chase on Albert who had kept on widening the gap. Their combined efforts were not enough as the gap kept on growing while from behind the four other Belgians, with an impressive Rob Peeters, were slowly gaining ground. The riders from other countries were nowhere to be seen.

Albert kept on going solo till the end and took home his second World Championship title. The chasing group consisted completely of the six other Belgians. Tom Meeusen and Rob Peeters were looking the best, but Meeusen fell in the sand in the last lap. Peeters did keep his stability and got a silver medal, Pauwels completed the podium. Nys ended as the last Belgian, the chase on Albert had destroyed him.

Ranking

External links
 
 

Men's elite race
UCI Cyclo-cross World Championships – Men's elite race